This list combines material found in several bibliographies of science fiction writer David R. Bunch. It should not be considered exhaustive, because no definitive Bunch bibliography is known to exist.

References 
 
 
 
 Science Fiction, Fantasy, & Weird Fiction Magazine Index (1890-2007). Miller, Steven T. and Contento, William G. CD-ROM. Oakland: Locus Press, 2007.
 
 

Bunch, David